The Apache XML project is part of the Apache Software Foundation and focuses on XML-related projects.

It consists of several sub projects:

Active sub projects
Xerces: An XML parser for Java, C++ and Perl
Xalan: An XSLT stylesheet processor for Java and C++ which implements the XPath query language.
Forrest: A standards-based documentation framework
XML-Security: A project providing security functionality for XML data 
Xindice: A native XML database 
XML Commons: A project focusing on common code and guidelines for XML projects 
XMLBeans: An XML-Java binding tool

Projects related to webservices
SOAP: Is an old implementation of the SOAP. This project based on IBM's SOAP4J implementation. It should no longer be used for new projects. Instead you should favour the Axis implementation.
XML-RPC: Apache XML-RPC is a Java implementation of XML-RPC, a protocol that uses XML over HTTP to implement remote procedure calls.
Axis: Apache Axis is the current implementation of the SOAP for Java and C++. It is the successor for the SOAP project.
WSIF: Web Services Invocation Framework is a simple Java API for invoking Web services.

No longer developed projects
AxKit: An XML-based web publishing framework in mod_perl 
Crimson: A Java XML parser derived from the Sun Project X Parser 
Xang: Framework for rapid development of dynamic server pages in ECMAScript (JavaScript)

XML software
XML